Scott Martin may refer to:

 Scott Martin (thrower) (born 1982), Australian athlete in shot put and discus
 Scott Martin (co-driver) (born 1981), British rallying co-driver
 Scott Martin (footballer) (born 1997), Scottish footballer (Hibernian FC)
 Scott Martin (Oklahoma politician) (born 1971), Republican member of the Oklahoma House of Representatives
 Scott Martin (Pennsylvania politician), Republican member of the Pennsylvania Senate

See also 
 Scott (surname)